Maharishi School may refer to:

 Maharishi School, Lancashire, a secondary school in Lancashire, England
 Maharishi School (US), a college preparatory school in Iowa, United States
 Maharishi School of Management, former name of Maharishi International University